Bob Keegan (sometimes credited as Robert Keegan) (3 December 1924 – 16 January 1988) was a British film and television actor. He was known for his television roles, such as Z-Cars (where he had a lengthy role as Sergeant Bob Blackitt), Softly, Softly (a Z-Cars spn-off, also as Blackitt), The First Lady, Under and Over, Beryl's Lot and Oh No It's Selwyn Froggitt. Keegan was also known for playing the role of "Harry Ware" in the 1971 film Straw Dogs. He died in January 1988 of lung cancer, at the age of 63.

References

External links 

image from Z-Cars
Robert Keegan at Theatricalia

1924 births
1988 deaths
Male actors from Liverpool
Deaths from lung cancer in England
British male film actors
British male television actors
20th-century British male actors